Mabizela is a surname. Notable people with the surname include:

Mbulelo Mabizela (born 1980), South African footballer
Sizwe Mabizela (born 1962), South African academic

Bantu-language surnames